A noose is a type of knot.

The Noose or Noose may refer to:
 The Noose (play), a 1926 play by Willard Mack
 The Noose (1928 film), an American silent film adaptation of the Mack play, directed by John Francis Dillon
 Noose (1948 film), a British film directed by Edmond T. Gréville
 Noose (1958 film), a Polish film directed by Wojciech Jerzy Has
 The Noose (TV series), a Singaporean comedy television program
 "The Noose," a song from the album Thirteenth Step by A Perfect Circle
 "The Noose," a song from the album Splinter by The Offspring
 "Noose", a song from the album Down by Sentenced